"Piece" is a pop song by Japanese recording artist Yui Aragaki. It was released as her third single on February 25, 2009.

Background
"Piece" was written and composed by singer-songwriter Minako Kawae. The song first premiered on Aragaki's Tokyo FM radio show, "School of Lock!", January 21, 2009. The single features a cover of Mongol800's hit song "Anata ni" and "Sparkle", written by Aragaki herself.

"Piece" was released in three formats: standard edition, limited edition A, which has an illustration cover drawn by Aragaki herself and limited edition B, which has an illustration cover drawn by Studio Ghibli animator Yoshiyuki Momose, who also directed an animated music video for the song.

Chart performance
"Piece" peaked at #6 on the daily Oricon singles chart and #7 on the weekly chart, selling 18,204 copies in its first week.

Track listing

Charts and sales

Release history

References

External links

2009 singles
Yui Aragaki songs
2009 songs
Warner Music Japan singles